The 1947 edition of the Campeonato Carioca kicked off on August 3, 1947 and ended on December 28, 1947. It was organized by FMF (Federação Metropolitana de Futebol, or Metropolitan Football Federation). Eleven teams participated. Vasco da Gama won the title for the 7th time. no teams were relegated.

System
The tournament would be disputed in a double round-robin format, with the team with the most points winning the title.

Torneio Municipal

Top Scores

Championship

Top Scores

References

Campeonato Carioca seasons
Carioca